Physalaemus evangelistai is a species of frog in the family Leptodactylidae.
It is endemic to Brazil.
Its natural habitats are subtropical or tropical moist shrubland, subtropical or tropical seasonally wet or flooded lowland grassland, swamps, and intermittent freshwater marshes.
It is threatened by habitat loss.

References

evangelistai
Endemic fauna of Brazil
Taxonomy articles created by Polbot
Amphibians described in 1967